M. P. Sarathy was an Indian politician and former Member of the Legislative Assembly of Tamil Nadu. He was elected to the Tamil Nadu legislative assembly from Vellore constituency as an Independent candidate in 1957 election and as a Dravida Munnetra Kazhagam candidate in 1967, and 1971 elections.

References 

Dravida Munnetra Kazhagam politicians
Living people
Year of birth missing (living people)
Madras MLAs 1957–1962
Tamil Nadu MLAs 1967–1972
Tamil Nadu MLAs 1971–1976